Sturgis is a town in Oktibbeha County, Mississippi. The population was 207 at the 2020 census.

Sturgis annually hosts "The Rally", an all-bike motorcycle rally, also known as the Little Sturgis Rally. According to Scott Smith, former Mayor of Sturgis, in 2005 around 20,000 visitors attended that year's rally. The most recent was August 2022 after a hiatus of 2 years due to COVID-19 concerns.

Geography
Sturgis is located at  (33.344027, -89.046618).

Demographics

As of the census of 2000, there were 206 people, 83 households, and 61 families residing in the town. The population density was 158.3 people per square mile (61.2/km). There were 92 housing units at an average density of 70.7 per square mile (27.3/km). The racial makeup of the town was 93.69% White, 5.83% African American, 0.49% from other races. Hispanic or Latino of any race were 0.97% of the population.

There were 83 households, out of which 28.9% had children under the age of 18 living with them, 59.0% were married couples living together, 12.0% had a female householder with no husband present, and 26.5% were non-families. 26.5% of all households were made up of individuals, and 18.1% had someone living alone who was 65 years of age or older. The average household size was 2.48 and the average family size was 2.98.

In the town, the population was spread out, with 24.3% under the age of 18, 6.3% from 18 to 24, 30.1% from 25 to 44, 18.4% from 45 to 64, and 20.9% who were 65 years of age or older. The median age was 37 years. For every 100 females, there were 98.1 males. For every 100 females age 18 and over, there were 83.5 males.

The median income for a household in the town was $33,125, and the median income for a family was $41,667. Males had a median income of $30,179 versus $20,625 for females. The per capita income for the town was $18,916. None of the families and 2.5% of the population were living below the poverty line, including no under eighteens and 11.1% of those over 64.

Education
The Town of Sturgis is served by the Starkville Oktibbeha Consolidated School District. West Oktibbeha County Elementary School (formerly Sturgis Elementary School) is in Sturgis. All residents are zoned to Armstrong Middle School and Starkville High School in Starkville.

It was previously in the Oktibbeha County School District, and Sturgis had its own schools, including Sturgis High School, which was merged with Maben High School to form West Oktibbeha County High School. In 2013, the Mississippi Legislature passed a bill requiring that all Oktibbeha County schools be merged into the Starkville School District.

In 2015 the West Oktibbeha County High School in Maben, which served Sturgis, consolidated into Starkville High.

Sturgis is served by the Starkville-Oktibbeha County Public Library System which operateas the Sturgis Public Library.

Sturgis South Bike Rally
For fourteen straight years, taking advantage of the built-in name recognition of the Sturgis Motorcycle Rally in Sturgis, South Dakota, Sturgis was home to the annual Sturgis South Bike Rally, which drew crowds of as many as 20,000 people. After being discontinued due to a funding conflict between rally organizers and local government from 2011-2013, the rally resumed in 2014.

Notable people
Kirby Jackson, a former professional American football defensive back who played for the Los Angeles Rams and the Buffalo Bills, was born in Sturgis.
Kid Thomas (musician) was born in Sturgis.

References

External links
 Greater Starkville Development Partnership Website

Towns in Oktibbeha County, Mississippi
Towns in Mississippi